Mumlu is a village in the municipality of Dağ Bilici in the Davachi Rayon of Azerbaijan.

References

Populated places in Shabran District